This is a list of radio stations in Asia.

Afghanistan 

Radio Afghanistan (Government Radio Station)
 AIR Afghanistan
 Arman FM - 98.1 FM
 Ariana FM (93.5 FM Kabul)
Radio Jawanan (Youth FM 97.5 FM) 
Kabul Rock FM 108.0 Kabul
 Radio Killid (88.0 FM Kabul) 
Spogmai FM (102.2 FM Kabul) 
Foreign Stations:
 Radio Azadi (100.5 FM - 1296 kHz Kabul)
 BBC Radio FM 89.0 Kabul

Armenia 
Radio Rossii (1566 AM Yerevan)
AvtoRadio FM (89.7 FM Yerevan)
Radio Chanson (90.1 FM Yerevan)
Radio Jan (90.7 FM Yerevan)
Vem Radio (91.1 FM Yerevan) 
Radio Mir (93.7 FM Yerevan)
Radio Aurora (100.7 FM Yerevan)
Radio Yerevan FM (101.9 FM Yerevan)
Radio Van (103.0 FM Yerevan)
Radio Marshall (103.5 FM Yerevan)
Radio MIG (103.8 FM Vanadzor)
Radio Hay (104.1 FM Yerevan) 
Radio Shant (104.1 FM Gyumri)
Russkoye Radio (104.9 FM Yerevan)
Hay FM (105.5 FM Yerevan)
Way f-m (105.9 FM Yerevan)
Sputnik Radio Armenia (106.0 FM Yerevan)
Lratvakan (106.5 FM Yerevan)
LavRadio (107.0 FM Yerevan)
Public Radio (107.7 FM / 69.7 FM Yerevan)

Bahrain 
 Bahrein News Agency
 Radio Bahrain (English Service/96.5 FM)
 Songs Radio (Arabic Service/93.3 FM)
 Shababiya Radio (Youth Radio/98.4 FM)
 Holy Quran Radio (106.1 FM)
 Your FM 104.2 (Hindi and Malayalam Music)
Foreign Stations:
 AFN Bahrain
 Alif Alif FM (Saudi Arabia Radio)
 BBC Arabic
 BSKSA Radio 
 BSKSA General Programme
 BSKSA Second Programme 
 BSKSA Quran Programme
 Emarat FM
 Mix FM (Saudi Arabia)
 MBC FM
 Panorama FM
 Monte Carlo Doualiya
 Radio Sawa Gulf
 Rotana FM (Saudi Arabia)
 Sawt el-Ghad (Lebanon)
 Sout Al Khaleej FM (Qatar)
 Studio 1 & 2 FM Aramco (Saudi Arabia)
 UFM (Saudi Arabia)

Bangladesh 

 Bangladesh Betar 
 BB Home Service
 FM 100
 Traffic Channel - 88.8 & 90.0 MHz in Dhaka
 BB External Service
 Radio Bhumi - FM 92.8 MHz in Dhaka
 ABC Radio - FM 89.2 MHz 
 Dhaka FM - FM 90.4 MHz in Dhaka 
 Radio Aamar - FM 88.4 MHz in Dhaka 
 Radio Foorti - FM 88.0 MHz in Dhaka, Chittagong, Sylhet, Rajshahi, Khulna, Barisal, Mymensingh & Cox's Bazar 
 Radio Metrowave - 1170 kHz MW.
 Radio Today - FM 89.6 MHz in Dhaka, Chittagong, Sylhet, Barisal, Khulna, Mymensingh, Bogra & Cox's Bazar 
Jago FM - FM 94.4
Radio Next - FM 93.2
Spice FM
 BBC Bengali - FM 100.0 MHz

Bhutan 
 AIR Bhutani
 AIR FM GOLD
 AIR NEW DELHI
 AIR NE
 BBS Radio
 Centennial FM 101
 Kuzoo FM
 Radio Valley 99.9 Thimpu (www.myradiovalley.com)
 Radio Waves

Brunei 
 BFBS Radio
 BFBS Radio Brunei - 101.7 FM Seria
 BFBS Gurkha Brunei - 89.5 FM Seria
 Kristal Radio
 Radio Al Quran - 89.1 FM Bandar Seri Begawan /99.7 FM Kuala Belait & Tutong
 Kristal FM - 90.7 FM	Bandar Seri Begawan /98.7 FM Kuala Belait & Tutong
 Progresif
 Progresif Radio (mobile application)
 RTB Brunei
 Nasional FM - 92.3 FM Bandar Seri Begawan /93.8 FM & 594 AM Kuala Belait & Tutong
 Pilihan FM - 95.9 FM Bandar Seri Begawan /96.9 FM Kuala Belait & Tutong 
 Pelangi FM - 91.4 FM Bandar Seri Begawan /91.0 FM Kuala Belait & Tutong 
 Harmoni FM - 94.1 FM Bandar Seri Begawan /97.7 FM Kuala Belait & Tutong 
 Nur Islam Network - 93.3 FM Bandar Seri Begawan /94.9 FM Kuala Belait & Tutong

Cambodia 
 Radio National of Kampuchea
 ABC Cambodia Radio 
 Bayon Radio
 Daun Penh EFM 
 Family FM 99.5 
 NRG 89.0 FM 
 Sarika FM 
 Vayo FM 
 Virgin Hitz Thailand
 Voice Of Koh Santepheap 
 VSK FM 
 Women's Media Centre of Cambodia
 FM 102
 Women's Community Radio
Foreign Stations:
 BBC World Service
 Radio Australia
 All India Radio
 Radio France International

China 

AIR Tibbati
Radio Beijing Corporation
Beijing News Radio
Beijing Joy FM (Literary Broadcasting)
Beijing Music Radio
Beijing Communication Radio (Traffic's Station)
Beijing Sports Station
Beijing Music Station
Beijing Foreign Broadcast
Beijing Public Service Radio
China National Radio
CNR 1 - Voice of China 106.1FM in Beijing (General/News Service)
CNR 2 - Voice of Economy 96.6FM in Beijing (Economy/Business Station)
CNR 3 - Music Radio 90.0FM
CNR 4 - YouRadio 101.8 FM
CNR 5 - Taiwan Service 1 - Sounds of China/China Voices
CNR 6 - Taiwan Service 2 - Sounds of Divine Land/Divine Voices
CNR 7 - Voice of Huaxia FM 104.9 - (Zhujiang delta, Hong Kong and Macao Service).
CNR 8 - Minorities Service (Korean, Mongolian and Kazakh and other languages service)
CNR 9 - Sounds of the Literary (Literature and entertainment programmes)
CNR 10 - Sounds of the Elderly (Broadcast for the elderly, including entertainment, health programmes)
CNR 11 - Tibetan Service
CNR 12 - Entertainment Radio
CNR 13 - Uyghur Service.
CNR Sounds of Hong Kong (Broadcasting in Hong Kong on DAB)
CNR Highway Traffic Radio.
CNR Sounds of China Countryside (Agriculture Info)
China Radio International
Easy FM (Mostly English Broadcasts)
Hit FM (Top 40 Hits)
CRI News Radio
CRI Language Channel (Foreign Languages Teaching Broadcasts)
CRI's English Service (Broadcasts on MW and SW)
CRI Foreign Broadcasts (In different languages on SW)
Chongqing Broadcasting Group
Chongqing News 96.8 FM
Chongqing Economic 101.5 FM
Chongqing Traffic 95.5 FM
Chongqing Music 88.1 FM
Chongqing City 93.8 FM
Chonqing Literary Radio 103.5 FM
Fujian Media Group
Fujian News Radio
South East Radio
Fujian Economy Radio
Fujian Traffic Radio
Fujian Urban Radio
Fujian Music Radio
Gansu Media Group
Gansu News Radio
Gansu Traffic Radio
Gansu Children's Radio
Gansu City FM
Gansu Economy Radio 93.4 FM
Gansu Rural Radio
Guangxi People's Broadcasting Station
News 910 FM91 AM792 (Guangxi News Radio)
Female Radio 970 FM97 AM1224 (Guangxi Women Radio)
Private Car 930 FM93 (Guangxi Urban Radio)
Guangxi Music Radio FM95
Guangxi Traffic Radio FM100.3
Beibu Bay Radio FM96.3 AM846 (Shortwave Foreign Broadcasts)
Guizhou Radio & TV
Guizhou News Radio
Guizhou Economy Radio
Guizhou Music Radio
Guizhou Urban Radio
Guizhou Traffic Radio
Guizhou Tourism Radio
Guizhou Story Radio
Jiangsu Radio Network
Jiangsu News Radio 97.2FM
Jiangsu Traffic Radio 106.8FM
Jiangsu Life Radio 91.1FM
Jiangsu Music Radio 99.0FM
Jiangsu Economic Radio 101.4FM
Jiangsu Literary Radio 104.6FM
Jiangsu Metro Music Radio 94.5FM
Henan Radio Network
Henan News Radio 
Henan Economic Radio
Henan Traffic Radio
Henan Music Radio
Henan Story Radio
Zhongdong Radio Network
Zhongdong News Radio
Zhongdong Economic Radio
Zhongdong Traffic Radio
Zhongdong Music Radio
Zhongdong Sports Radio
Zhongdong Literary Radio
Zhongdong Life Radio
Nanjing Radio Network
Nanjing News Radio
Nanjing Music Radio
Nanjing Traffic Radio
Hebei Radio Network
Hebei News Radio
Hebei Economic Radio
Hebei Traffic Radio
Hebei Literary Radio
Hebei Life Radio
Hebei Music Radio
Hebei Farmers Radio
Hebei Tourism Radio
Heilongjiang Radio Network
Heilongjiang News Radio
Heilongjiang Traffic Radio
Heilongjiang Life Radio
Heilongjiang Music Radio
Heilongjiang Urban Women Radio
Heilongjiang Loving Channel
Heilongjiang College Radio
Heilongjiang Korean Radio
Heilongjiang Voice of Northern Wilderness
Hunan Radio
Hunan Communication Radio 91.8FM
Hunan Economy Radio 90.1FM
Hunan News Radio 102.8FM
Hunan Music Radio 89.3FM
Hunan Modern Music Radio 97.5FM
Hunan tourism Radio 106.9FM
Hunan Life Radio 93.8FM
Hubei Radio and Television
Hubei News Radio
Hubei Economy Radio
Hubei Classical Music Radio
Hubei Traffic Music Radio
Hubei Life Health Radio
Hubei Women Radio
Hubei Traffic Radio
Hubei Metro Music Radio
Hubei Information Radio
Hubei Rural Radio
Jilin Broadcasting Network
Jilin News Radio
Jilin Traffic Radio
Jilin Economic Radio
Jilin Rural Radio
Jilin Music Radio
Jilin Information Radio
Jilin Health Entertainment Radio
Jilin Tourism Radio
Jilin Educational Radio
Liaoning Radio and Television
Liaoning News Radio
Liaoning Economic Radio
Liaoning Literary Radio
Liaoning Traffic Radio
Liaoning Rural Radio
Liaoning Info Radio (Available in Dalian City)
Ningxia Radio and Television
Ningxia News Radio 891 AM
Ningxia Traffic Radio
Ningxia Economic Radio
Ningxia Urban Radio
Radio Guangdong
Radio Guangdong News Station
Pearl Radio Economic Station
Radio Guangdong Music FM
Radio Guangdong Voice of the City
Southern Life Radio
Guanzhou Traffic News
Radio Guangdong Stock Market
U Radio Voice of Guangdong
ESFM
Shandong Radio & TV Station
Shandong News Radio
Shandong Economy 594 AM / 96FM
Shandong Female Anchor Radio
Shandong Life Radio
Shandong Traffic Radio
Shandong Rural Radio
Shandong Music Radio
Shandong Sports Radio
Shandong Digital
Shanghai Media Group
Shanghai News Radio
Eastern China Regional News
CBN Radio (Shanghai Economy Radio)
Voice of Pujiang
Shanghai Sports News Radio
Shanxi Radio and Television
Shanxi News Radio 819 AM/90.4 FM
Shanxi Economic Radio 95.8 FM
Shanxi Art and Culture Radio 101.5 FM
Shanxi Traffic Radio 88.0 FM
Shanxi Health Radio 105.9 FM
Shanxi Rural Radio 603 AM
Shanxi Music Radio 94.0 FM
Shenzhen Radio Station
Shenzhen News and Finance Radio
Shenzhen Lifestyle Radio
Shenzhen Music Radio
Shenzhen Traffic Radio
Tianjin People's Broadcasting Station
Tianjin News Radio
Tianjin Coastal/Marine Radio
Tianjin Traffic Radio
Tianjin Economic Radio
Tianjin People's Radio
Tianjin Life Radio
Tianjin Music Radio
Tianjin Fiction Radio
Voice of Tibet "CTB" (Xizang People's Broadcasting Station)
CTB Chinese Language Radio 93.3 FM
CTB Urban Life Radio 98.0 FM
CTB Tibetan Language Radio 101.6 FM
CTB Kamba Language Radio 103.0 FM
CTB Science and Education Radio 
Yunnan Radio & TV Station
Yunnan News Radio
Yunnan Economic Radio
Yunnan Traffic Radio
Yunnan Shangri-La's Radio (Chinese & International)
Yunnan Children Radio
Yunnan Educational Radio
Yunnan National Radio
Yunnan Rural Radio
Zhejiang Radio & TV Group
Zhejiang News Radio
Zhejiang Economy 95.0 FM
Zhejiang Culture 99.6 FM
Zhejiang Music 96.8 FM
Zhejiang Traffic Radio 93 FM
ZheJiang Female Radio 104.5 FM
ZheJiang Sound City 107

East Timor
 Radio Timor Leste
Foreign Stations:
 Radio Australia (106.4 FM Dili)
 RDP Internacional (105.3 FM Dili)

Cocos (Keeling) Islands 
 ABC Local Radio
 6CKI Voice of the Cocos Keeling Islands
 Red FM

Hong Kong 

Commercial Radio Hong Kong
CR 1 - Supercharged 881 [FM 88.1-89.5 MHz]
CR 2 - Ultimate 903 [FM 90.3-92.1 MHz]
CR AM 864 [AM 864 kHz]
RTHK
RTHK 1 [FM 92.6-94.4 MHz]
RTHK 2 [FM 94.8-96.9 MHz]
RTHK 3 [AM 567 kHz, AM 1584 kHz/FM 106.8 MHz (Hong Kong South)], FM 97.9 MHz (Happy Valley, Jardine's Lookout, Hong Kong Parkview), FM 107.8 MHz (Tseung Kwan O, Tin Shui Wai)
RTHK 4 [FM 97.6-98.9 MHz]
RTHK 5 [AM 783 kHz, FM 99.4 MHz (Tseung Kwan O), FM 106.8 MHz (Tuen Mun, Yuen Long)]
RTHK 6 (AM 675 kHz) (24-hour relay of China National Radio)
RTHK Mandarin Channel (AM 621 kHz, FM 100.9 MHz Causeway Bay, Wan Chai, Tuen Mun, FM 103.3 MHz Tseung Kwan O, Tin Shui Wai)
RTHK Radio The Greater Bay (FM 102.8 MHz)
Metro Broadcast Corporation
Metro Finance [FM 102.4-106.3 MHz]
Metro Info [FM 99.7-102.1 MHz]
Metro Plus [AM 1044 kHz]

India 

All India Radio
AIR Vividh Bharati
AIR National Channel
AIR Regional Services
AIR Local Stations
AIR Urdu Service
AIR FM Gold
AIR FM Rainbow
AIR External Service
Radio City 91.1
Big FM 92.7
Red FM 93.5
Radio Mirchi 98.3

New Delhi based Radio station 
 Radia Ditect FM 107.2 MHz
 AIR FM Rainbow / FM-1 (102.6 MHz)
 AIR FM Gold /FM-2 (106.4 MHz)
 AIR Rajdhani
 Gyanvani Channel (105.6 MHz)
 Fever 104 (104 MHz)
 Radio Mirchi FM (98.3 MHz)
 Hit FM (95 MHz)
 Radio City FM (91.1 MHz)
 Radio One FM (94.3 MHz) (Only English Radio station of Delhi)
 Red FM (93.5 MHz)
 Big FM (92.7 MHz)
 Radio Nasha (107.2 MHz)
 Radio Jamia 90.4 FM
 Delhi University Educational Radio (Available only in SARRC Country area) * (DU Radio FM) (90.4 MHz)
 Apna Radio IIMC 96.9 FM
 Vividh Barti (100.1 MHz)
 Noida FM (107.4 MHz)
 Oye 104.8 FM
 Radio SD 90.8 
 FM NCR
 Gurgaon Ki Awaz 
 107.8 FM Gurugram

Kolkata based Radio Station 
 Radio SRFTI (90.4 MHz, Available in and around the film institute area)
 Radio JU (90.8 MHz, Available within a 65 km radius of the University, from 11:00 AM to 7:30 PM)
 Y FM NSHM (91.2 MHz, Available within a 10 km radius of the institute, from 9:00 AM to 7:00 PM)
 Friends FM (91.9 MHz)
 Big FM (92.7 MHz)
 Red FM (93.5 MHz)
 Radio One (94.3 MHz)
 Radio Mirchi (98.3 MHz)
 AIR FM Gold (100.2 MHz)
 AIR FM Vividh Bharati (101.8 MHz)
 Fever 104 FM (104 MHz)
 Radio ISHQ (104.8 MHz)
 Gyan Vani (105.6 MHz)
 Aamar FM (106.2 MHz)
 AIR FM Rainbow (107 MHz)
 Radio City
 Radio Mantra
 Hit FM

Mumbai based Radio stations 
 bansal24hr.fm 95.5
 Vividh Bharati
 Jago Mumbai 90.8
 Radio City 91.1FM
 Big FM 92.7
 Red FM 93.5
 Radio One 94.3 (Only English Radio station of Mumbai)
 Radio Mirchi 98.3 FM 98.3
 Radio Dhamaal 106.4
 AIR FM Gold 100.7
 RAINBOW FM 102.2
 Fever 104 FM 104.0
 Oye 104.8 
 104.8
 AIR FM Rainbow 107.1
 Mumbai One
 Redtro 106.4
 Gyan Vani
 Radio MUST
 Hasya Katta Official

Thane based Radio stations 
 Hasya Katta Official

Hyderabad based Radio stations 
 Bol 90.4 FM - 90.4	- Multilingual
 Radio City - 91.1	- Telugu
 Big 92.7 FM - 92.7	- Telugu/Hindi
 Red FM - 93.5 - Telugu
 Fever FM -	94.3 - Hindi
 Radio Mirchi -	95 - Hindi
 Radio Mirchi -	98.3 - Telugu
 All India Radio (AIR / AIR / Twin Cities 
 FM Rainbow)- 101.9 - Telugu
 All India Radio (AIR / AIR / Vvd Bharti) - 102.8	- Hindi
 Kool 104 -	104 - English
 Gyan Vani - 105.6 - Hindi
 Magic Fm - 106.4 -Telugu
 Radio Charminar - 107.8 - Telugu/Hindi
 Deccan Radio - 107.8 - Hindi

Ahmedabad based Radio Station 
 Radio Mirchi - 98.3 FM (Times Group)
 My FM - 104.3 FM D B Corp Ltd.
 Red FM - 93.5 FM (Sun Group
 Radio City - 91.1 FM (Music Broadcast Limited)
 Radio One - 95.0 FM (Only Bollywood Retro Station of Ahmedabad)
 AIR Vividh Bharati - 96.7 FM (All India Radio)
 Micavaani - 90.4 FM (Mudra Institute of Communications)
 AIR Gyan Vaani - 105.4 FM (All India Radio)
 Mirchi Love - 104 FM (Times Group)
 ___ - 100.1 FM

Bengaluru based Radio stations 
 Radio City 91.1 FM - Kannada
 Indigo 91.9 FM FM - (English, Devotional)
 Big 92.7 FM - Kannada
 Red FM 93.5 FM - Hindi
 Radio ONE FM 94.3 - English
 Mirchi 95 95 FM - Hindi[10]
 Radio Mirchi 98.3 FM Kannada
 Ragam 100.1 FM (Classical)
 FM Rainbow 101.3 FM (Kannada, Hindi, English)
 Vividh Bharti 102.9 FM (Kannada, Hindi)
 Fever FM 104 FM (Hindi)
 Radio Active Community Radio 106.4 FM (Kannada, English, Hindi)

East Indian AM/MW Stations 
 AIR FM GOLD
 AIR FM RAINBOW
 AIR NEW DELHI
 AIR INDRAPRASTH
 VBS DELHI 1
 VBS DELHI 2
 RADIO SHOW 
 AIR ROHTAK
 AIR AGRA
 AIR LUCKNOW
 AIR ALLHABAD
 AIR FAIZABAD
 AIR NEPAL
 AIR GORAKHAPUR
 AIR GAYA
 AIR PATNA
 AIR NALANDA
 AIR INDORE
 AIR BHOPAL
 AIR JABALPUR
 AIR REWA
 AIR KANPUR
 AIR MERUT
 AIR NOIDA
 AIR MAUTURA
 AIR NIZAMABAD
 AIR DOON
 AIR MASURI
 AIR SHIMLA
 AIR JAMMU
 AIR GURUGRAM
 AIR FARIDABAD
 AIR OLD DELHI
 AIR NATIONAL NEWS
 AIR BHAGALPUR
 AIR JAIPUR
 AIR RAIPUR
 AIR BILASPUR
 AIR ITRASHI
 AIR KOTA
 AIR JAISALMER
 AIR UDYAPUR
 AIR SONIPAT
 AIR AMBALA 
 AIR GURUDASPUR
 AIR AMRITSAR
 AIR BATIDA
 AIR LUDHIYNA
 AIR LEH
 AIR LADDKH
 AIR KASMIR
 AIR POK
 AIR CHANDIGARH

North East Indian AM/MW Stations 
 AIR FM GOLD
 AIR FM RAINBOW
 AIR TAVAG
 AIR NE
 VBS NE 1
 VBS NE 2
 RADIO VOA NE
 AIR ITANAGAR
 AIR DISPUR
 AIR KOLKATA
 AIR GUHAHATI
 AIR KAMAKHYA
 AIR TIBATI
 AIR DULLGARH
 AIR SILIGURI
 AIR HAWDA
 AIR MALDA
 AIR BANGLA
 AIR FM BANGLA
 AIR ASSAMI
 AIR NAGAPURI
 AIR TRUPURA
 AIR ARUNPRABHA
 AIR NORTH CENTRAL
 AIR NEWS NE
 AIR MEGALAYA
 AIR MIZORAM
 AIR MYAMA
 VBS NE 
 VBS NE 1
 VBS NE 2

South Indian AM/MW Stations 
 AIR FM GOLD
 AIR FM RAINBOW
 AIR HYDERABAD
 AIR MADRAS
 VBS TAMILANADU 1
 VBS TAMILANADU 2
 RADIO TELGHU
 AIR TRUPATI
 AIR ODISHA
 AIR BUVNESVERRA
 AIR GADALPUR
 AIR BOKARO
 AIR TATA NAGAR
 AIR VIZ
 AIR VIZ HINDI
 AIR SIRI CITY
 AIR VIJAYAWADA
 AIR VARNGAL
 AIR BADRACHALAM
 AIR HYADRABAD 1
 AIR HYADRABAD 2
 AIR MALYAM
 AIR KOCHI
 AIR RAMESHWARAM
 AIR SLEEM
 AIR MADHURI
 AIR OTIYEE
 VBS TAMILANADU
 VBS ANDRA
 VBS HYADRABAD
 VBS KELRA
 VBS TERUVENTPURAM
 AIR TERUVENTPURAM 1
 AIR TERUVENT 2
 AIR CALICUT

West Indian AM/MW Stations 
 AIR FM GOLD
 AIR FM RAINBOW
 AIR MUMBAI
 AIR MARTHI
 VBS GUJARAT 1
 VBS GUJARAT 2
 RADIO GUJRATI
 AIR KANADA
 AIR BAGLEARU
 AIR HUBLIEE
 AIR MAGLORE
 AIR MASURO
 AIR KOSTEL
 AIR NOVI MUMBAI
 AIR NAGPUR
 AIR PUNE 1
 AIR PUNE 2
 AIR NASIK
 AIR AMRAVATI 
 AIR AHMADNAGAR
 AIR SURAT
 AIR GANDHINAGAR
 AIR KATAK
 AIR VAPI
 AIR BADORA
 AIR AHAMADABAD
 AIR BALSAAD
 VBS TANE
 VBS SURAT HINDI
 VBS GUJARAT NEWS
 VBS MARATI NEWS
 VBS DWARIKA
 AIR JAIPUR 2
 AIR POKHARAN
 AIR NAGPUR MARATHI

Private FM Stations 
 AIR FM GOLD
 AIR FM RAINBOW 
 RED FM(93.5 MHz. Delhi, Noida, Mumbai, Jaipur, Hadrabad, Vizag, Allhabad, Faizabad, Patna, Kolkata, Lucknow, Bhopal, Indore, Raipur, Varanasi, Jabalpur)
 Jio FM (Nationalizing)
 Radio Mirchi (98.3 403 Radio station in India)
 Big FM (92.7 FM.All India)
 VBS (have 890 FM Station in All India)
 Radio Fever 
 Radio Mantra
 Radio Net
 BIH FM
 RED FM
 SFM
 ZABARDEST FM 
 ZEE FM
 JIO FM
 JIO FM NEWS

Indian Radio in Other Countries 
 VBS (have 102 FM stations in Asia, Europa, USA)
 Air Radio Nepali
 Air Radio China
 Air Radio Multan
 Air Radio Baloch
 Air Radio Baloch International
 Air Radio Padti
 Air Radio Male
 Air Radio Male News
 Air Radio Paribhasha
 Air Radio Asia
 Air Radio Kabul
 Air Bagdad
 Air Great UAE
 AIR Greater Saudi
 Air Great Israel
 Air Hiberw
 Air Ezypte
 Air Aduri
 Air Tibbat
 Air Tokyo
 Air Chahiye
 Air Russia
 Air Australia
 Air Den 
 Ventam All India Radio
 Air UK
 AIR UK HINDI
 AIR BALIGE
 AIR DW
 AIR USA
 AIR USA 1
 AIR LEADERS USA 
 AIR LOVE CHANDA
 AIR SURINAME
 AIR GUYNA
 AIR MARITHUS
 AIR FIJHI
 AIR SVWA
 AIR CAPE TOWN
 All India Radio World Country In 2,or 4 Radio Station
 RED FM
 SFM
 ZABARDEST FM 
 ZEE FM
 JIO FM
 JIO FM NEWS
 Hasya Katta Official   
List of Indian-language radio stations

Indonesia 

 RRI
 RRI PRO 1 – Regional radio
 RRI PRO 2 – Music & entertainment radio
 RRI PRO 3 – News radio
 RRI PRO 4 – Cultural radio
 Voice of Indonesia
 KG Media
 Radio Sonora
 Smart FM
 Motion Radio
 Elshinta Media
 Radio Elshinta
 Fit Radio
 Mahaka Media
 Gen FM
 Jak FM
 Most Radio
 Kis FM
 Mustang FM
 Hot 93.2 FM
 Masima Radio Network
 Bahana Radio
 Delta FM
 FeMale Radio
 Prambors
 MNC Radio Networks
 Global Radio
 MNC Trijaya FM
 RDI
 V Radio
 MRA Media
 Brava Radio
 Cosmopolitan FM
 Hard Rock FM
 I-Radio
 Indika Group
 Indika FM
 Hitz FM
 MPG Media
 Smooth FM
 ZFM
 Media Group
 MG Radio Network

Iran 

Islamic Republic of Iran Broadcasting (IRIB) Domestic Stations:
IRIB Radio Iran (National Radio) 
IRIB Radio Farhang (Culture)
IRIB Radio Payam (Info & Entertainment)
IRIB Radio Quran (Holy Quran)
IRIB Radio Maaref (Education)
IRIB Radio Javan (Youth)
IRIB Radio Varzesh (Sports)
IRIB Radio Salamat (Health)
IRIB Radio Eghtesad (Economy & Business)
IRIB Radio Namayesh (Arts)
IRIB Radio Ava (Music)
IRIB Radio Goftogoo (Interviews)
IRIB Radio Saba
IRIB Radio Talavat
IRIB Radio Monasebati
IRIB Radio Ziarat
IRIB Foreign Stations:
 IRIB World Service (Broadcast in many languages)
IRIB Provincial Stations:
 IRIB Radio Abadan (Khuzestan Province)
 IRIB Radio Arak (Markazi Province)
 IRIB Radio Ardabil (Ardabil Province)
 IRIB Radio Alborz (Alborz Province)
 IRIB Radio Ahvaz (Khuzestan Province)
 IRIB Radio Bandar Abbas (Hormozgan Province)
 IRIB Radio Birjand (South Khorasan Province)
 IRIB Radio Borujerd (Lorestan Province)
 IRIB Radio Bushehr (Bushehr Province)
 IRIB Radio Bojnord (North Khorasan Province)
 IRIB Radio Dezful (Khuzestan Province)
 IRIB Radio Gorgan (Golestan Province) 
 IRIB Radio Gilan (Gilan Province)
 IRIB Radio Hamadan (Hamadan Province)
 IRIB Radio Isfahan (Isfahan Province)
 IRIB Radio Ilam (Ilam Province)
 IRIB Radio Kerman (Kerman Province)
 IRIB Radio Kermanshah (Kermanshah Province)
 IRIB Radio Kish (Hormozgan Province)
 IRIB Radio Lorestan (Lorestan Province)
 IRIB Radio Mashhad (Razavi Khorasan Province)
 IRIB Radio Malayer (Hamadan Province)
 IRIB Radio Mahabad (West Azerbaijan Province)
 IRIB Radio Maragheh (East Azerbaijan Province)
 IRIB Radio Qazvin (Qazvin Province)
 IRIB Radio Qom (Qom Province)
 IRIB Radio Sanandaj (Kurdistan Province)
 IRIB Radio Sari (Mazandaran Province)
 IRIB Radio Shahr-e Kord (Chaharmahal and Bakhtiari Province)
 IRIB Radio Semnan (Semnan Province)
 IRIB Radio Shiraz (Fars Province)
 IRIB Radio Tehran (Tehran Province)
 IRIB Radio Tabriz (East Azerbaijan Province)
 IRIB Radio Urmia (West Azerbaijan Province)
 IRIB Radio Yasuj (Kohgiluyeh and Boyer-Ahmad Province)
 IRIB Radio Yazd (Yazd Province)
 IRIB Radio Zahedan (Sistan and Baluchestan Province)
 IRIB Radio Zanjan (Zanjan Province)

Iraq 
 Iraqi Media Network
 Al Aan FM is available in the following cities and frequencies:
 Mosul & Duhok 92.7  MHz
 Kirkuk 97.3 MHz
 Hawija 97.3 MHz
 Al Iraqiya Radio
 Al Bilad Radio 
 Al Huda Radio 
 Al-Rashed Radio 
 Radio Dijla 
 Sumer FM 
 Voice of Iraq
Foreign Stations:
 Radio Free Iraq

Israel

Japan 

 NHK
 NHK Radio 1 (JOAK-AM 594 MW Tokyo)
 NHK Radio 2 (JOAB-AM 693 MW Tokyo)
 NHK FM Broadcast (JOAK-FM 82.5 Tokyo)
 Japan FM Network / National Radio Network
 Air-G Radio (FM Hokkaido)
 Tokyo FM
 FM Osaka
 FM Aichi
 FM Aomori
 FM Ehime
 FM Fukui
 FM Fukuoka
 FM Fukushima
 FM Gimu
 FM Gunma
 Japan FM League
 Cross FM
 FM802
 FM North Wave
 J-Wave
 Zip FM
 Japan Radio Network
 ABC Radio
 Akita Hōsō
 Aomori Hōsō
 CBC Radio
 MBS Radio
 TBS Radio
 Megalopolis Radio Network
 FM COCOLO
 Inter FM
 Love FM
 Radio Nikkei
 Radio Nikkei 1
 Radio Nikkei 2

Jordan 
 Radio Hala - 102.1 FM Amman 
 Bliss Radio - 104.3 FM Amman 
 Jordan Radio
 Radio Jordan (National Service)
 Amman FM
 Radio Jordan - Foreign Service
 Spin Jordan - 94.1 FM Amman 
 Beat FM - 102.5 FM Amman
 Hayat FM - 104.7 FM Amman 
 Mazaj FM - 95.3 FM Amman
 Mood 92 - 92.0 FM Amman (English Language Radio)
 Play FM - 99.5 FM Amman
 Radio Fann - 97.7 FM Amman 
Foreign Stations:
 Radio Sawa Jordan 98.1 FM Amman
 Rotana Radio Jordan - 99.9 FM Amman /100.1 FM Aqaba (Arabic Music)
 Sawt El Ghad Radio Jordan - 101.5 FM Amman (http://sawtelghad.fm)

Kazakhstan 
 Kazakhstan Radio and Television Corporation
 Kazakh Radio
 Astana Radio
 Radio Classic
 Shalkar FM
 Delo FM 
 Love Radio 
 Radio NS 
 Tengri FM 
Foreign Stations:
 Radio Record
 Russkoye Radio

Kuwait 
 Radio Kuwait
 Kuwait Radio 1 (Main Channel)
 Kuwait Radio 2
 Kuwait Radio Quran
 Kuwait FM
 Easy FM 92.5
 Radio Classical Arabic (Old Arabic Music)
 Radio Hona Kuwait
 Radio Shaabya
 Super Station
 Al Watan Radio 
 Marina FM
 UFM (Malayalam Music Station)

Kyrgyzstan 
 Kyrgyz Television & Radio Corporation
 Birinchi Radio
 Kyrgyz Radio
 Myn Kyal FM
 Baldar FM
 Radio Dostuk
 Obondoru Radio
 Parlamenttik Radio 
 Tumar FM 
Foreign Stations:
 AvtoRadio
 Dance FM (Russia) 
 Echo of Moscow
 Europa Plus
 Hit FM (Russia)
 Radio Mayak
 Retro FM (Russia) 
 RFE/RL Azattyk Radio (Kyrgyz Language Service)
 Radio Record
 Vesti FM

Laos 
 Bokeo Radio Station - 102.75 FM Bokeo
 Bolikhamsay Radio Station - Bolikhamsay
 China Radio International - 93.0 FM Vientiane
 Khammouane Radio Station - 95.5 FM Khammouane
 Lao National Radio - 567 AM & 6135 SW Vientiane
 LNR Phoenix Radio - 95.0 FM Vientiane
 LNR Radio 1 - 103.7 FM Vientiane
 LNR VIP Radio - 97.3 FM Vientiane
 Lao People's Army Broadcasting - 99.7 FM (Various Cities)
 Luang Prabang Radio Station - 103.5 FM & 705 AM Luang Prabang
 Public Security Radio Station - 101.5 FM Vientiane
 Radio Australia - 96.0 FM Vientiane
 Radio France International - 100.5 FM Vientiane
 Vientiane City Radio Station - 98.8 FM Vientiane

Lebanon
Al-Nour
Fame FM
Mix FM Lebanon
Nidaa al Maarifa 
NRJ Lebanon 
Pax Radio 
Radio Delta Lebanon 
Radio Lebanon / Radio Liban 
Radio Liban Culture
Radio Liban Libre 
Radio One Lebanon
Radio Orient 
Risala Radio 
Sawt el Ghad 
Sawt el Mada 
Sawt el Noujoum 
Voice of Lebanon, actually two rival stations
Voice of Lebanon (100.3 and 100.5FM) (sub-title Voice of Freedom and Dignity) based in Beirut owned by Kataeb Party 
Voice of Lebanon (93.1, 93.3 and 93.5) (based in Dbayeh, Matn)
Armenian stations
Radio Sevan 
 Voice of Van (also known as Vana Tsayn) 
Online stations
Jaras FM 
Light FM 
Sawt al Mousika
Foreign Stations:
Radio Rotana
Radio Sawa Levant
Virgin Radio Lebanon

Macau 
 Radio Macau
 Rádio Macau in Cantonese FM 100.7 MHz
 Rádio Macau in Portuguese FM 98.0 MHz
Radio Vilaverde Lda FM 99.5 MHz

Malaysia 

 RTM
 Radio Klasik FM
 Nasional FM
 TraXX FM (English Language Station)
 Ai FM (Mandarin Language Station)
 Minnal FM (India Focused Station)
 Asyik FM (Orang Asli People Station)
 RTM Local Stations (In Most Malaysian States)
 BFM 89.9 (English-language only)
 Astro Radio
 Era
 Hitz
 My
 Sinar
 Melody
 Mix
 Gegar
 Raaga
 Lite
 Zayan
 GoXuan
 Media Prima
 Fly FM
 Hot FM
 8FM
 Buletin FM
 Molek FM
 Ooga X
 kupikupifm
 CITYPlus FM
 Putra FM
 Star Media Radio Group
 988 FM
 Suria FM

Maldives 
 Voice of Maldives - 1449 AM Male
 Raajje FM - 91.0 FM Male
 Radio 1 (Radio Eke) - 103.8 FM Male
 Radio 2 - 89.0 FM Male
 Radio Atoll - 96.0 FM Male
 Capital Radio - 93.6 FM Male
 Dhi FM - 95.2 FM Male
 Far Away FM - 96.6 FM Male
 HFM - 92.6 FM Male
 Sun FM - 94.6 FM Male

Mongolia 
 Mongolia National Broadcaster
 MNB Public Radio
 MNB Public Radio 2
 MNB P3 (Public Radio 3)
 Voice of Mongolia
Foreign Stations:
 China Radio International - 103.7 FM Darhan

Myanmar 
 Myanmar Radio and TV (MRTV)
 Cherry FM
 Mandalay FM
 Myanmar National Radio
 Padamyar FM 
 Pyinsawaddy FM
 Shwe FM 
 Bagan FM
 Defence Forces Broadcasting Station
 Thazin radio

Nepal
Radio Nepal
 Image Fm - 97.9 FM 
 Radio Kantipur - 91.6 FM
Radio Adhyatma Jyoti - 104.8 Mhz
 Radio Lekhnath
 Nepaliko Radio - 88.8 FM Bhaktapur 
 Radio Mirmire - 89.4 FM Kathmandu 
 Radio Upatyaka - 87.6 FM Kathmandu 
 Hajurko Radio - 102.1 FM Ramechhap

North Korea 

 Korean Central Broadcasting Station
 
 Voice of Korea

Oman 
  Al Wisal 96.5 FM
  Hala FM (102.7 in Muscat)
 BBC World Service
 Monte Carlo Dualia (MCD 92.2 FM)
Radio General FM Service
Radio Quran
English FM Service
Oman Radio Youth
 Virgin Radio Oman (English) (100.9)
TFM Oman (English)
 Hi FM (English) (95.9 in Muscat)
Sultanate of Oman Radio (English) (90.4/90.8)
 Merge 104.8 FM (English)

Pakistan 

 Top Web Radio
 Radio Asia Live The Heart Beat of Asia, The Biggest Radio Channel of Pakistan which represent to Asian Community
 AM/MW Stations
 Radio Pakistan
 Azad Kashmir Radio
 Major FM Stations
 The Magic Radio Pakistan's First Internet & Mobile Radio with Live News! THE MAGIC RADIO 
 Chiltan FM 88 (Chiltan FM 88 a newly born FM radio channel is a part of Asman Radio Pvt. Ltd. First aired its transmission in January 2009 for the listeners of Quetta/Mustung. It has risen as one of the popular channel, having the best technical facilities, perfect blend of programming expertise (Urdu, English & Regional) who have made Chiltan FM 88 important part of the families of the listeners.) http://www.chiltanfm88.tk. (Programme Manager: Muhammad Faisal Javaid)
 FM Sunrise Pakistan (97 MHz. Hassanabdal, Jehlum, Sahiwal & 96 Sargodha) http://www.fmsunrise.com
 City FM 89 (89 MHz. Karachi, Lahore, Islamabad, Faisalabad) http://cityfm89.com
 Josh FM 99 (99 MHz. Karachi, Lahore & Hyderabad) http://joshfm99.com email: feedback@joshfm99.com
 Radio1 FM 91 (91 MHz. Karachi, Lahore, Islamabad, Gwadar) http://www.91radio1.fm/home.asp
 Radioactive FM 96 (96 MHz. Karachi) http://www.radioactive96.fm
 PowerFM99 (99 MHz. Islamabad, Vehari, Abbottabad, Muzaffarabad, Bagh) https://web.archive.org/web/20061105040823/http://www.power99.com.pk/
 FM 100 Pakistan (100 MHz. Karachi, Lahore, Islamabad)
 FM 101 (101 MHz. Karachi, Lahore, Islamabad, Faisalabad, Quetta, Hyderabad, Sukkur, Sialkot, Larkana, Peshawar, AJK)
 Mast FM 103 (103 MHz. Karachi, Lahore, Faisalabad, Multan)
 Buraq FM (104 MHz. Peshawar, Sialkot, & Mansehra)
 Buraq FM (105 MHz. Mardan)
 Sachal's Hot 105 FM (105 MHz. Karachi, Larkana, Nawabshah, Sukkur, Hyderabad, Mirpur Khas, Jaccobabad, Quetta)
 Hum FM (106.2 MHz. Karachi, Lahore, Islamabad, Sukkar)
 Apna Karachi 107 (107 MHz. Karachi)
 Rural Area/Smaller FM Stations
 Apna FM88 (88 MHz. Layyah)
 Lakki FM88 (88 MHz. Sarai-e-Naurang, Lakki Marwat)
 Aap Ka Humsafar FM92 (92 MHz. Noriabad, Khairpur, Kasur)
 Jeevey Pakistan (97 MHz. Khanewal, Lodhran, Rahim Yar Khan, Ahmed pur East)
 Campus Radio 104.6 (104.6 MHz. Lahore)
 Awaz FM (105 MHz. Gujarat)
 FM IIUI 90.6 (90.6 MHz. Islamabad)
 Campus Radio FM-107 (107 MHz. Peshawar)
 Apna Fm 88 (88 MHz. Muzaffargarh)
 RASTA FM 88.6

Philippines

Qatar 
 Qatar Broadcast Corporation
 Qatar Radio
 QBS FM
 Holy Quran Radio
 Oryx FM (French Language Station)
 Al Kass Radio
 Al Rayyan Radio
 Qatar Foundation Radio
 QF Radio 91.7 FM 
 QF Radio 93.7 FM
 Sout Al Khaleej FM 
Foreign Stations:
 BBC Arabic
 Deutsche Welle (Arabic Service)
 Emarat FM (UAE)
 MBC FM
 Radio France Internationale
 Radio Monte Carlo Doualiya
 Radio Sawa Gulf

Saudi Arabia 
 Saudi Broadcasting Corporation
 Studio 1 Saudi Aramco
 Studio 2 Saudi Aramco
 Mix FM
 Alf Alf FM
 MBC FM
 Panorama FM
 Rotana
 U FM 
 Star FM
 Riyadh Radio (General Program)
 Jeddah Radio (Second Program)
 Saudia Radio (Saudi Arabia Radio)
 International Radio
 Quran Radio
 Neda Radio (Call of Islam Mecca)
 Radio Sunna
Al-Azm Radio

Singapore 

 SPH Radio
 MONEY FM 89.3 
 ONE FM 91.3 
 Kiss92 FM 
 96.3 Hao FM 
 UFM100.3
 Mediacorp Radio
  Ria 897
 Gold 905
 Symphony 924
 YES 933
 CNA938
  Warna 942
 Class 95
  Capital 958
  Oli 968
 Love 972
 987
 So Drama! Entertainment
 883Jia
  Power 98 Love Songs 

Foreign Station:
 BBC
 BBC World Service FM 88.9

South Korea 

 Korean Broadcasting System
 KBS Radio 1(AM 711kHz/FM 97.3MHz)
 KBS Radio 2(AM 603kHz/FM 1066.9MHz)
 KBS Radio 3(AM 1134kHz)
 KBS 1FM (FM 93.1MHz)
 KBS 2FM (FM 89.1MHz)
 KBS Hanminjok Radio (AM 972kHz/1170kHz)
 KBS World Radio
 U-KBS MUSIC
 EBS Radio (FM 104.5MHz)
 Munhwa Broadcasting Corporation 
 MBC Standard FM (AM 900kHz/FM 95.9MHz)
 MBC FM4U (FM 91.9MHz)
 Seoul Broadcasting System
 SBS LoveFM (AM 792kHz/FM 103.5MHz)
 SBS PowerFM (FM 107.7MHz)
 YTN News FM (FM 94.5MHz)
FEBC (AM 1188kHz, 1566kHz)
CPBC (FM 105.3MHz)
BBS
CBS
TBN
TBS (Seoul Only)

Sri Lanka 
 Sri Lanka Broadcasting Corporation formerly known as Radio Ceylon
 Radio Sri Lanka
 Sinhala National Service
 City FM
 Sinhala Commercial Service
 Thendral
 Tamil National Service
 Kandurata FM
 English Service
 Lite 89.2
 Gold FM
 Sun FM 97.3
 Sirasa FM
 YES FM
 Hiru FM
 Sri FM
 Sha FM
 Lakhanda
 Sarasa Radio - Online
 Beat FM - Online

Syria 

 General Organization of Radio and TV (Syria) (ORTAS)
 Sawt Al Shabab FM
 Damascus Radio 
 Radio Amwaj FM 
 Radio Souryana 
 Al Karma FM 
 Cham Radio 
 Radio Zenobia FM 
 Al Aan FM
 Al-Madina FM
 Arabesque FM
 Melody FM Syria
 Mix FM Syria
 Rotana Style FM
 Sham FM

Taiwan 
 Central Broadcasting System (CBS)
 Radio Taiwan International 
 Asia FM 
 Best Radio 
 Broadcasting Corporation of China (BCC)
 BCC Country Radio
 BCC Course Radio
 BCC Formosa Radio
 I GO AM 531
 I Like Radio
 I Radio
 BCC News Radio
 Fishery Radio Station 
 Fuxing Broadcasting Station (FHBS Radio)
 FHBS Radio 1 (National Audience)
 FHBS Radio 2/ Fu Hsing BS (International Shortwave Audience)
 Happy Radio 
 Hit FM Taiwan
 ICRT (International Community Radio Taipei) 
 Kaohsiung Broadcasting Station
 Kiss Radio Taiwan
 National Education Radio
 Police Radio Station (PRS) 
 Radio Taipei (Taipei Broadcasting Station)
 UFO Radio Network
 Voice of Han Broadcasting Network

Wikipedia's Taiwan Radio Station Table (in Chinese)

Tajikistan 
 TeleRadioCom (National Committee on television and broadcasting of the Government of Tajikistan)
 Radio Tajikistan (Radioi Tojikiston-Радиои Точикистон) 
 Radioi Farhang
 Ovozi Tojik
 Sadoi Dushanbe
 AFM Radio - Top 40 Music 
 Asia Plus Radio 
 Oriono Media 
 Oriono Radio
 Imruz Radio
 Radio Khovar - State News Agency 
 Radio Vatan

Thailand 
 HS 1 AS Radio (Bureau of the Royal Household)
 MCOT Radio 
 Bangkok Stations (Only service served in Bangkok and its vicinity are listed)
 Lukthung Mahanakhon (broadcasts in Thai, first FM radio station in Thailand) - 95.0 MHz
 Khluen Khwam Khit (broadcasts in Thai; Talk) - 96.5 MHz
 Active Radio (broadcasts in Thai; Sports and Lifestyle) - 99.0 MHz
 News Network (broadcasts in Thai) - 100.5 MHz
 Met 107 (broadcasts in English) - 107.0 MHz
 Eazy FM (broadcasts in Thai and English) - 105.5 MHz (Operated by Tero Entertainment, formerly operated by Channel 3 (Thailand))
 Regional Radio Network (53 Stations)
 National Broadcasting Services of Thailand
 Radio Thailand
 Radio Thailand for Learning and Warning Network (Formerly Known as National Education Radio)
 Radio Thailand World Service
 Thai Public Broadcasting Service
 Thai PBS Podcast (Online)
 Office of the NBTC Radio (but use the name 1 Por Nor Radio)
 Saranrom Radio (Ministry of Foreign Affairs (Thailand))
 MOE Radio
 The National Assembly Radio and Television Broadcasting Station (TPChannel)
 TP Radio (or Radio Parliament)
 Royal Thai Army Radio Network (127 Stations)
 JS Signal Radio (Signal Department)
 The 1st Division, King's Guard Radio Station
 TV5 Radio (only service served in Bangkok)
 FM 93.5 and 103.5 MHz
 DAB+ Radio Test Project (VHF Channel 6 - 6C:185.360 MHz)
 Voice of Navy (Royal Thai Navy)
 Royal Thai Air Force Radio
 Live 89.5 (Phuket)
 Phuket Island Radio 91.5 & 92.75FM
 Fabulous 103.0 MHz in Pattaya area

Turkmenistan 
 Turkmen Radio
 Turkmen Radio 1 Watan
 Turkmen Radio 2 Çar Tarapdan
 Turkmen Radio 3 Miras
 Turkmen Radio 4 Owaz

 Radio Free Europe (Azatlyk Radiosy) - Turkmen Service available on Shortwave and Sateliite Broadcasts.

United Arab Emirates 
 Abu Dhabi Media
 Abu Dhabi FM
 AD Classic FM
 Emarat FM
 Quran Kareem Radio
 Radio Mirchi
 Star FM
 ARN - Arabian Radio Network
 Al Arabiya Radio
 Al Khaleeya
 City 101.6
 Dubai Eye 103.8 
 Dubai 92
 Hit 96.7
 Radio Shoma 93.4
 Tag 91.1
 Virgin Radio Dubai
 Fun Asia
 Luv 107.1
 Beat 97.8
 Big FM 106.2
 
 Channel 4 Radio Network
 Channel 4 FM 104.8
 Radio 4 FM 89.1H
 Al Rabia 107.8 FM
 Gold 101.3 FM
 DMI - Dubai Media Incorporated
 Dubai FM Radio 93
 Noor Dubai FM
 Sharjah FM
 Pulse 95 Radio
Foreign Stations: 
 BBC World Service
 Sawa Gulf

Uzbekistan 
 MTRK - National Television and Radio Company of Uzbekistan
 O'zbekiston
 Toshkent
 Mahalla (Society)
 Yoshlar (Youth)
 Oriat FM 
 Oriat Dono 
 Ozbegim Taronasi Radio FM 101 
 Radio Grande (Радио Гранд)
 Radio Maxima 
 Avtoradio Hamroh 
 Vodiy Sadosi (Voice of the Valley) 
 Radio Navruz (New Day) 
 Classic FM
 Radio Poytaxt (Capital)
 Uzbek edition
 Russian edition
Ruxsor FM (Face FM)
Fargona FM (Ferghana FM)

Vietnam 

 An Giang Radio (Long Xuyen) 
 Binh Duong Radio (92.5)
 Hanoi Radio (90.0)
 THVL Radio (Truyen Hinh Vinh Long) (90.2)
 Voice of Ho Chi Minh City (VOH)
 Voice of Vietnam (VOV)
 VOV1 - The News and Current Affairs Channel - On air for 18 hours from 05.00am till midnight every day. It provides listeners with the latest information on current affairs, politics, diplomacy, economics, literature and art. The channel is broadcast on short- and medium-wave frequencies of 594, 630, 648, 655, 675, 690, 711, 5975, 9530 and 7210 kHz.
 VOV2 - The Cultural and Social Affairs Channel - Broadcasting 19 hours a day, it provides news and analysis, disseminates public knowledge and features discussions on cultural, literature and art and spiritual issues. It caters for listeners of all age groups, social sections and occupations.
 VOV3 - The Music, Information and Entertainment Channel - Broadcasting 24 hours a day, it brings high-quality music to listeners with a diverse range of tastes and styles. Its first programme was broadcast on September 7, 1990 on the FM frequency of 100 MHz and the channel has ever since built up a strong following among the majority of young listeners.
 VOV4 - Ethnic minority language programming
 VOV5 - The Overseas Service Channel - Designed for Vietnamese nationals residing overseas and foreigners around the world. The channel is broadcast on short and medium waves in 12 languages.

Yemen 

 Yemen General Corporation for Radio & TV (Government Public Station)
 Sana'a Radio (1st Prog.) - National Radio Station
 Aden Radio (2nd Prog.) - National Radio Station
 + Local Radio Stations for most Governorates of Yemen
 Sam FM

See also
Lists of radio stations in Africa
Lists of radio stations in the Americas
Lists of radio stations in Europe
Lists of radio stations in Oceania

Notes and references

External links
FMLIST worldwide database of FM stations
FMSCAN worldwide FM reception prediction
MWLIST worldwide database of MW and LW stations
MWSCAN worldwide MW and SW reception prediction
Radio in Asia
Worldwide FM Internet Radio

Asia
Radio stations